The 1971 Men's African Volleyball Championship was in Cairo, Egypt, with 7 teams participating in the continental championship.

Teams

Results

Final

Final ranking

References
 Men Volleyball Africa Championship 1971 Cairo (EGY)

1971 Men
African championship, Men
Men's African Volleyball Championship
International volleyball competitions hosted by Egypt
1971 in Egyptian sport